The Wittgenstein Award is an Austrian science award supporting the notion that "scientists should be guaranteed the greatest possible freedom and flexibility in the performance of their research." The prize money of up to 1.5 million euro make it the most highly endowed science award of Austria, money that is tied to research activities within the five years following the award. The Wittgenstein-Preis is named after the philosopher Ludwig Wittgenstein and is conferred once per year by the Austrian Science Fund on behalf of the Austrian Ministry for Science.

Objectives
The award provides aims to express recognition and to support "excellent scientists" up to 55 years of age who "have produced exceptional scientific work and who occupy a prominent place in the international scientific community". Awardees receive financial support up to 1.5 million euro to be spent over a period of five years. The award should enhance and extend the research possibilities of the awardees and their research groups.

Nomination, requirements and selection 
Nominations can be expressed by rectors as well as vice rectors for research of Austrian universities; the president of the Austrian Academy of Sciences; the president of the Institute of Science and Technology Austria (ISTA); and all previous Wittgenstein-Preis awardees. Self-nomination is not permitted, researchers of any discipline are entitled. There are no quotas regulating the distribution of awards between subject areas. Nominees must be 60 years old or younger; permanently employed at an Austrian research institution; internationally recognised in their respective academic field; and have their center of life in Austria for at least one year at the time of the nomination. The awardees are selected by an international jury of experts, the same jury also selects the recipients of the related Start-Preis.

Recipients and affiliation

 1996: Erwin Friedrich Wagner, Research Institute of Molecular Pathology (IMP)
 1996: Ruth Wodak, Institut für Sprachwissenschaften, Universität Wien
 1997: Marjori and Antonius Matzke, Institut für Molekularbiologie, Österreichische Akademie der Wissenschaften
 1997: Erich Gornik, Institut für Festkörperelektronik, Technische Universität Wien
 1998: Peter Zoller, Institut für Theoretische Physik, Leopold-Franzens-Universität, Innsbruck
 1998: Walter Schachermayer, Institut für Informationssysteme, Technische Universität Wien
 1998: Georg Gottlob, Institut für Informationssysteme, Technische Universität Wien
 1999: Kim Nasmyth, Research Institute of Molecular Pathology (IMP)
 2000: Peter Markowich, Institut für Mathematik, Universität Wien
 2000: Andre Gingrich, Institut für Ethnologie, Kultur- und Sozialanthropologie, Universität Wien
 2001: Heribert Hirt, Department für Pflanzenmolekularbiologie, Universität Wien
 2001: Meinrad Busslinger, Research Institute of Molecular Pathology (IMP)
 2002: Ferenc Krausz, Institut für Photonik, Technische Universität Wien
 2003: Renée Schroeder, Institut für Mikrobiologie und Genetik, Universität Wien
 2004: Walter Pohl, Forschungsstelle für Geschichte des Mittelalters, Österreichische Akademie der Wissenschaften
 2005: Rudolf Grimm, Institut für Experimentalphysik, Universität Innsbruck
 2005: Barry J. Dickson, Research Institute of Molecular Pathology (IMP)
 2006: Hannes-Jörg Schmiedmayer, TU Wien
 2007: Christian Krattenthaler, Fakultät für Mathematik, Universität Wien
 2007: Rudolf Zechner, Institut für Molekulare Biowissenschaften, Universität Graz
 2008: Markus Arndt, Fakultät für Physik, Universität Wien
 2009: Gerhard Widmer, Institut für Computational Perception, Universität Linz
 2009: Jürgen Knoblich, Institut für Molekulare Biotechnologie (IMBA)
 2010: Wolfgang Lutz, International Institute for Applied Systems Analysis, Vienna Institute of Demography of the Austrian Academy of Sciences and Department of Socioeconomics at the Vienna University of Economics and Business
 2011: Jan-Michael Peters, Research Institute of Molecular Pathology (IMP)
 2011: Gerhard J.Herndl, Department für Meeresbiologie, Fakultät für Lebenswissenschaften, Universität Wien
 2012: Niyazi Serdar Sariçiftçi, Institut für Physikalische Chemie und Institut für Organische Solarzellen, Universität Linz 
 2012: Thomas Henzinger, ISTA
 2013: Ulrike Diebold, Institut für Angewandte Physik, TU Wien
 2014: Josef Penninger, Institut für Molekulare Biotechnologie (IMBA)
 2015: Claudia Rapp, Institut für Byzantinistik und Neogräzistik, University of Vienna
 2016: Peter Jonas, Institute of Science and Technology Austria
 2017: Hanns-Christoph Nägerl, University of Innsbruck
 2020: Adrian Constantin, Department of Mathematics, University of Vienna
 2021: Monika Henzinger, Faculty of Computer Science, University of Vienna
 2022: Christa Schleper, Department of Functional and Evolutionary Biology, University of Vienna

References

External links 
 
  web page with information on recipients

Austrian science and technology awards
Awards established in 1996